Wagon Train is an American Western television series that was produced by Revue Studios. The series was inspired by the 1950 John Ford film Wagon Master. Its first five seasons were broadcast on the NBC network and the remaining three on ABC.

Originally an hour-long program filmed in black and white, Wagon Train expanded to 90-minute color episodes in its seventh season, but returned to hour-long black and white for its eighth year. During its run, 284 episodes were broadcast, of which 252 were an hour in length and 32 were 90 minutes. Wagon Train was an immensely popular program during its original run. In the autumn of 1959, two years after its inception, it ranked as one of seven Westerns in the Nielsen top 10 in the United States. In the 1961–62 season, it surpassed Gunsmoke in popularity and ranked as the most popular program on American television.

Wagon Train revolved around the characters traveling to California from St. Joseph, Missouri, by a caravan of covered wagons. In its first three seasons and part of the fourth, the regular cast consisted of Ward Bond as Major Seth Adams, the trailmaster, Robert Horton as Flint McCullough, the scout, Terry Wilson as Bill Hawks, the ramrod, and Frank McGrath as Charlie Wooster, the cook. Ward Bond died of a heart attack on November 5, 1960, with the last seven episodes in which he appeared broadcast posthumously. An assistant scout, Duke Shannon, played by Scott Miller, was introduced two months later, in January 1961, and after another two months, a new trailmaster, Christopher Hale, played by John McIntire, took over the running of the wagon train in March 1961, replacing Major Adams.

At the end of the fifth season, in June 1962, Robert Horton left the series to pursue a career in musical theatre. In June 1963, the final episode of the sixth season introduced Michael Burns as teenager Barnaby West, who became a recurring character in the seventh season, which also introduced Robert Fuller as the new scout, Cooper Smith, joining Duke Shannon and ultimately becoming the wagon train's sole scout when Scott Miller left the series in April 1964, with the last episode of the 90-minute seventh season. McIntire, Fuller, Wilson, McGrath, and Burns carried the show through its eighth and final year.

Season overview

Episodes
Titles, credits, and air dates are taken from Wagon Train — The Television Series by James Rosin

Season 1 (1957–58)

Season 2 (1958–59)

Season 3 (1959–60)

Season 4 (1960–61)

Season 5 (1961–62)
Final season to air on NBC. Several season 5 episodes are in color.

Season 6 (1962–63)
First season to air on ABC.

Season 7 (1963–64)
All episodes in color and run for 90 minutes.

Season 8 (1964–65)
The final season reverts to black-and-white and runs for 60 minutes.

References
Footnotes

Bibliography
Primary:

Supplementary:

External links
 
 

Lists of American Western (genre) television series episodes